King Loiyumba, also known as Meidingu Loiyumpa, was a Meitei monarch and a ruler of Kangleipak kingdom. He provided the Meetei kingdom with a written constitution which is known as the Loiyumba Sinyen. 

Roso Phishahanba was appointed the head of weaving loisang (department) during the time of Meidingu Loiyumba. The Puya "Loiyumpa Silyen" or "Loiyumba Shinyen"  record names of royal weavers such as Naotam Phishapa, Ngangti Phishapa, Yangnu Phishapa, Heisu Naha Phishapa, etc.

References 

 

History of Manipur
Meitei royalty
Lists of monarchs
Sanamahists
Ningthoucha dynasty